Psalm 114 is the 114th psalm of the Book of Psalms. In the slightly different numbering system used in the Greek Septuagint version of the bible and in the Latin Vulgate, this psalm is Psalm 113.

Structure and theme
At eight verses, this psalm is comparatively concise. It is composed of four stanzas of two lines, which the word Jacob envelops. The two central stanzas evoke with images full of life the miracle of the Red Sea and the passage of the Jordan. God is evoked only at the end of the Psalm, doubtless to arouse the expectation.

Psalm 114 begins with the Hebrew 'בְּצֵאת יִשְׂרָאֵל, מִמִּצְרָיִם;  בֵּית יַעֲקֹב, מֵעַם לֹעֵז' and in Hebrew is an acrostic Poem. It is also one of the so-called Egyptian Hallel prayers, although it is sometimes ascribed to King David.

Verses 1-2

When Israel went out of Egypt,
The house of Jacob from a people of strange language,
Judah became His sanctuary,
And Israel His dominion.
This first stanza recalls that the Hebrew people are born in the exodus from Egypt. The words "sanctuary" and "dominion" ("domain" in the New Catholic Bible) designate the entire Holy Land, the inheritance of God, not only in the geographical sense but also in a spiritual sense. The miracles that allow Israel to cross the Red Sea and cross the Jordan River are poetically enhanced by the process of hyperbole and by images evoking a life of natural elements, water and mountains. It is a means of manifesting all creation with Israel and actively participating in its march towards the Promised Land.

Uses

Judaism

Is one of six psalms (113-118) of which Hallel is composed. On all days when Hallel is recited, this psalm is recited in its entirety.
Is recited on the first and/or eighth days of Passover in some traditions.

Christianity
Since the sixth century, the psalm has been used as a reading at Christian burial services, and also in ministry to those who are dying. It has also been read at Easter Day services, as Israel's deliverance from slavery is seen as a metaphor for deliverance from sin.

Protestant Christianity 
In the Revised Common Lectionary, the Psalm appears in Year A on the seventeenth Sunday after Pentecost.

Orthodox Christianity
In Slavic and Greek Orthodox churches, it is sung as an antiphon for the feast of Theophany, for the following Sunday and for Palm Sunday.

Catholic
St. Benedict of Nursia chose this psalm as one of the psalms sung for the offices of Vespers. Since the early Middle Ages, Psalm 114 has been performed at the office of Vespers on Monday, according to the Rule of St. Benedict (AD 530).

In the Liturgy of the Hours today, the first part of Psalm 114 is sung or recited on Vespers Sunday. It is the only psalm traditionally chanted using Tonus peregrinus.

Literature
John Milton wrote "A Paraphrase on Psalm 114" among his poems of 1645.
Part of the psalm is quoted at the beginning of Dante's Purgatorio.

Music
Jean-Joseph Cassanéa de Mondonville, grand motet In exitu Israel (1755)

Antonio Vivaldi, motet In exitu Israel 113 RV 604

Jan Dismas Zelenka, two settings, ZWV 83 and ZWV 84, both scored for SATB soloists, chorus (SATB), two oboes, strings and continuo (1725 and 1728)

References
Citations

Bibliography

External links 

 in Hebrew and English - Mechon-mamre
 King James Bible - Wikisource

114
Hallel
Passover songs